Garmab (also Romanized as Garmāb) is a village in Golian Rural District, in the Central District of Shirvan County, North Khorasan Province, Iran. At the 2006 census, its population was 107, in 32 families.

References 

Populated places in Shirvan County